Wild Heart is the seventh full-length solo studio album by American musician Mindi Abair. Released on May 27, 2014, Wild Heart marks Abair's fourth release on Concord Records imprint, Heads Up International. The album debuted at number 1 on the Billboard Jazz Albums chart, staying there for two weeks.   Wild Heart received a 2015 Grammy nomination in the Contemporary Instrumental Album category, Abair's second Grammy nomination.

Background and recording
Wild Heart was recorded in late 2013 and early 2014 at several studios including Manifest Music in Santa Monica, California, Elevated Basement Studio in Savannah, Georgia, Morrisound in Tampa, Florida and Skip Saylor Studios in Northridge, California.  The album features several guest musicians, including Max Weinberg, Gregg Allman, Booker T. Jones, Keb' Mo', Joe Perry and Trombone Shorty.

Style and composition
Wild Heart saw Abair stepping away from her traditional smooth jazz style, for a more rock n roll influenced sound.

Critical reception

Wild Heart received mostly positive reviews from critics, who often commented on the different sound of the album.  James Woods of AXS said "Wild Heart’s roots actually go back to when Abair found herself “moonlighting”—performing a lot of rock and roll, blues and organic music. So it should come as no surprise that sharing the stage with the likes of Aerosmith, Bruce Springsteen and Duran Duran would eventually be absorbed into her musical psyche. And it was those experiences that inspired Abair to want to capture the mojo she’s been holding in for so long." and Thom Jurek of AllMusic called the record "a much rowdier, grimier fashion."

Jazz Weekly said “Abair’s sax growls, grunts and grinds like it’s a smoky joint in Lafayette, Louisiana, with more gristle than a T-Bone steak at The Pantry.”  AllMusic said of the album; “Though it pays unapologetic tribute to retro inspirations, it does so with 21st century sophistication, a gritty, raucous spirit, and exceptional creative imagination.”

Track listing

Personnel 
 Mindi Abair – alto saxophone, baritone saxophone, tenor saxophone, vocals (2), handclaps (8)
 Adam Berg – acoustic piano (1, 3, 8), handclaps (1), organ (2, 3, 5), tambourine (2, 5, 6), synthesizers (3, 4)
 Dave Yaden – acoustic piano (4, 9)
 Booker T. Jones – Hammond B3 organ (7, 10)
 Lance Abair – organ (8)
 Gregg Allman – Hammond B3 organ (11), guitars (11), vocals (11)
 Itai Shapira – guitars (1-10), bass (1-10), handclaps (1, 8)
 Joe Perry – guitar (6)
 Keb' Mo' – guitar (7), tambourine (7), vocals (7)
 Waddy Wachtel – guitars (8)
 Dave Burris – electric guitars (11)
 Kevin Scott – bass (11)
 Jake Najor – drums (1, 2, 3, 5, 6, 9)
 Blake Colie – drums (4)
 James Gadson – drums (7, 10)
 Max Weinberg – drums (8)
 Bud Harner – crash cymbal (1)
 Elizabeth Lea – trombone (1-9)
 Trombone Shorty – trombone (1)
 Todd Simon – trumpet (1-9), horn arrangements (1-9)

Production 
 John Burk – executive producer
 Bud Harner – executive producer, management 
 Mindi Abair – producer
 Todd Simon – producer
 Adam Berg – producer, engineer, mixing 
 Itai Shapira – producer, engineer 
 Shane Baldwin – engineer
 David Burris – engineer
 Jim Morris – engineer
 John Wydrycs – engineer
 Allen Franco – second engineer, assistant engineer
 Kevin Cohen – assistant engineer
 John Silverman – assistant engineer 
 Paul Blakemore – mastering
 Patty Palazzo – cover design 
 Greg Allen – photography

Chart positions

References

2014 albums
Mindi Abair albums